Transcription factor 4 (TCF-4) also known as immunoglobulin transcription factor 2  (ITF-2) is a protein that in humans is encoded by the TCF4 gene located on chromosome 18q21.2.

Function 

TCF4 proteins act as transcription factors which will bind to the immunoglobulin enhancer mu-E5/kappa-E2 motif. TCF4 activates transcription by binding to the E-box (5’-CANNTG-3’) found usually on SSTR2-INR, or somatostatin receptor 2 initiator element. TCF4 is primarily involved in neurological development of the fetus during pregnancy by initiating neural differentiation by binding to DNA. It is found in the central nervous system, somites, and gonadal ridge during early development. Later in development it will be found in the thyroid, thymus, and kidneys while in adulthood TCF4 it is found in lymphocytes, muscles, mature neurons, and gastrointestinal system.

Clinical significance 

Mutations in TCF4 cause Pitt-Hopkins Syndrome (PTHS). These mutations cause TCF4 proteins to not bind to DNA properly and control the differentiation of the nervous system. It has been suggested that TCF4 loss-of-function leads to decreased Wnt signaling and, consequently, a reduced neural progenitor proliferation. In most cases that have been studied, the mutations were de novo, meaning it was a new mutation not found in other family members of the patient. Common symptoms of Pitt-Hopkins Syndrome include a wide mouth, gastrointestinal problems, developmental delay of fine motor skills, speech and breathing problems, epilepsy, and other brain defects.

References

Further reading

External links 
 
 

Transcription factors
Gene expression